Thomas Joseph Dunphy (born December 12, 1937) is a Canadian politician, teacher and realtor. He represented 3rd Queens in the Legislative Assembly of Prince Edward Island from 1986 to 1996 as a Liberal.

Dunphy was born in 1937 in Peakes Station, Prince Edward Island. Dunphy graduated from the Nova Scotia Agricultural College with a two-year degree in agricultural studies in 1958, and from Macdonald College at McGill University with a Bachelor of Science in agriculture in 1960. He was married to Rita Kenny, and then Marion MacRae-Gillis in 1978. Tom has 4 children Peter, Maggie, Kimberley, and Tracy. As well as 4 grandchildren, Sebastian, Sarah, Liam and Patrick. Prior to entering politics, Tom was a teacher in Prince Edward Island and Quebec. He also worked with Dr Leo Killorn in the PEI addiction treatment center.

Dunphy entered provincial politics in 1986, when he was elected a councillor for the electoral district of 3rd Queens. He was re-elected in the 1989 election. In November 1991, Dunphy was appointed to the Executive Council of Prince Edward Island as Minister of Transportation and Public Works. Dunphy was re-elected in 1993, but was dropped from cabinet following the election. He did not re-offer in the 1996 election. Following his political career, Dunphy worked as a realtor.

References

1937 births
Living people
Members of the Executive Council of Prince Edward Island
Prince Edward Island Liberal Party MLAs
Canadian real estate agents
Nova Scotia Agricultural College alumni
McGill University Faculty of Agricultural and Environmental Sciences alumni